By Reason of Insanity may refer to:
 By Reason of Insanity (TV series), a 2015 BBC documentary miniseries
 By Reason of Insanity (film), a 1982 Canadian short courtroom drama television film
 A novel